Jia Aoqi (born March 26, 1992) is a Chinese Sanda kickboxer, currently competing in the featherweight division of Wu Lin Feng. A professional competitor since 2015, he was the 2019 WLF 67 kg World Cup winner.

As of September 2022, he is the #3 ranked super featherweight according to Combat Press.

Kickboxing career

Wu Lin Feng

WLF 2019-20 World Cup
Aoqi faced Hamza Essalih at Wu Lin Feng 2019: WLF -67kg World Cup 2019-2020 1st Group Stage on June 29, 2019. It was the first bout of the Wu Lin Feng Group A and D round robin, with the eventual group winner qualifying for the 2019-20 tournament final. He won the fight by a second-round technical knockout. Aoqi next faced the former Enfusion 67 kg champion Ilias Bulaid at Wu Lin Feng 2019: WLF -67kg World Cup 2019-2020 3rd Group Stage on August 31, 2019. The fight was ruled a draw after the first three rounds, with Aoqi being awarded the unanimous decision after an extra round was contested. Aoqi next faced Wei Ninghui at Wu Lin Feng 2019: WLF -67kg World Cup 2019-2020 5th Group Stage on October 26, 2019, in the final bout of the group A and D round robin. He won the fight by a dominant unanimous decision, with all of the judges scoring the fight 30–27 in Aoqi's favor.

These three victories earned Aoqi a place in the WLF World Cup 2019-2020 Final, which was held on January 11, 2020. Aoqi faced Tawanchai PK Saenchaimuaythaigym in the semifinals of the one-day tournament. He won the fight by a second-round knockout, stopping Tawanchai with a flurry of punches fifty seconds into the second round. Aoqi advanced to the tournament finals, where he faced the defending champion Petchtanong Banchamek. He won the fight by unanimous decision, with all of the judges scoring the fight 29–28 for him. Aside from winning his first professional title, Aoqi was awarded a prize of $100,000 as well.

Losing streak
After capturing the World Cup title, Aoqi was booked to face Liu Xiangming at Wu Lin Feng 2020: King's Super Cup 2nd Group Stage on June 13, 2020. He lost the fight by a second-round knockout, as Xiangming stopped him with a head kick. Despite this loss, Aoqi was scheduled to face the pound for pound talent Wei Rui at Wu Lin Feng 2020: King's Super Cup 5th Group Stage on September 23, 2020. He lost the fight by unanimous decision. Aoqi next faced Ji Xiang at Wu Lin Feng 2020: China 70kg Championship Tournament on November 28, 2020. He lost the fight by a second-round knockout.

Regardless of these losses, Aoqi was scheduled to take part in the 2021 Wu Lin Feng Global Kung Fu Festival, which was held on January 23, 2021, in Macao, China. He faced Ji Xiang in the quarterfinal bout and was able to avenge his loss, as he won the fight by unanimous decision, with scores of 29–28. Aoqi faced another former opponent, Liu Xiangming, in the tournament semifinals. He suffered his second career loss to Xiangming, who won the fight by unanimous decision.

Continued WLF career
Aoqi faced Hu Yafei at Wu Lin Feng 2021: World Contender League 4th Stage on May 29, 2021, in the first round of the group A Gold Belt qualification tournament. He won the fight by decision. Aoqi next faced Er Kang at Wu Lin Feng 2021: World Contender League 5th Stage on July 3, 2021. He won the fight by unanimous decision, with scores of 30–27. Aoqi faced Wang Pengfei at Wu Lin Feng 2021: World Contender League 6th Stage on September 30, 2021, in the final round of the group tournament. He won the fight by unanimous decision.

These three wins earned Aoqi a place in the final tournament of the Golden Belt contender league. He faced Wei Ninghui in the semi final bout at Wu Lin Feng 2021: World Contender League 7th Stage on November 27, 2021. He won the fight by unanimous decision, with scores of 29–28.

Aoqi faced Meng Gaofeng at Wu Lin Feng x Huya Kung Fu Carnival 6 on July 9, 2022. He won the fight by unanimous decision, with score of 29–28.

Aoqi faced Wacharalek Or.Kwanmuang at Wu Lin Feng 531 on September 24, 2022. Wacharalek was deducted a point before the start of the bout for missing weight. Aoqi won the fight by unanimous decision. He twice knocked his opponent down, once in the second and once in the third round.

Aoqi was expected to face Mikel Sortino in the quarterfinals of the -67 kg Wu Lin Feng tournament at Wu Lin Feng 2023: Chinese New Year on February 4, 2023, but was forced to withdraw with an undisclosed injury.

Titles and achievements

Amateur
2011 ASEAN Martial Arts Festival Sanda Championships 
2013 National Muay Thai Championships in Kunshan 
2014 National Muay Thai Championships 
2014 National Martial Arts Sanda Championship Runner- Up -70 kg
2016 National Martial Arts Sanda Championship Runner- Up -70 kg
2017 National Martial Arts Sanda Championship Champion -70 kg

Professional
2019 Wu Lin Feng World Cup -67 kg Champion

Fight record

|-  style="background:#cfc;"
| 2022-09-24 || Win || align=left| Wacharalek Or.Kwanmuang||  Wu Lin Feng 531|| Zhengzhou, China || Decision (Unanimous) || 3 || 3:00

|-  style="background:#cfc;"
| 2022-07-09 || Win|| align=left| Meng Gaofeng ||  Wu Lin Feng x Huya Kung Fu Carnival 6|| Zhengzhou, China || Decision (Unanimous) || 3 ||3:00

|-  style="background:#cfc;"
| 2021-11-27 ||Win || align=left| Wei Ninghui || Wu Lin Feng 2021: World Contender League 7th Stage Contender League Semi Final || Zhengzhou, China || Decision (Unanimous) || 3 ||3:00

|-  style="background:#cfc;"
| 2021-09-30 || Win || align=left| Wang Pengfei || Wu Lin Feng 2021: World Contender League 6th Stage || Zhengzhou, China || Decision (Unanimous)|| 3 ||3:00 
|-  style="background:#cfc;"
| 2021-07-03 || Win || align=left| Er Kang || Wu Lin Feng 2021: World Contender League 5th Stage || Zhengzhou, China || Decision (Unanimous) ||  3|| 3:00
|-  style="background:#cfc;"
| 2021-05-29 || Win || align=left| Hu Yafei || Wu Lin Feng 2021: World Contender League 4th Stage || Zhengzhou, China || Decision || 3 || 3:00
|-  style="background:#fbb;"
| 2021-01-23 || Loss || align=left| Liu Xiangming || Wu Lin Feng 2021: Global Kung Fu Festival, -67 kg Tournament Semi Final || Macao, China || Decision (Unanimous) || 3||3:00
|-  style="background:#cfc;"
| 2021-01-23 || Win|| align=left| Ji Xiang || Wu Lin Feng 2021: Global Kung Fu Festival, -67 kg Tournament Quarter Final || Macao, China || Decision (Unanimous) || 3||3:00
|-  style="background:#fbb;"
| 2020-11-28 || Loss|| align=left| Ji Xiang || Wu Lin Feng 2020: China 70kg Championship Tournament || Zhengzhou, China || KO (High Knee) || 2 ||
|-  style="background:#fbb;"
| 2020-09-23 || Loss|| align=left| Wei Rui || Wu Lin Feng 2020: King's Super Cup 5th Group Stage || Zhengzhou, China || Decision (Unanimous) || 3 || 3:00
|-  style="background:#fbb;"
| 2020-06-13 || Loss || align=left| Liu Xiangming || Wu Lin Feng 2020: King's Super Cup 2nd Group Stage || Zhengzhou, China || TKO (Right Head Kick) || 2 ||
|-
|-  style="background:#CCFFCC;"
| 2020-05-15 || Win ||align=left| Wang Pengfei || Wu Lin Feng 2020: King's Super Cup 1st Group Stage|| Zhengzhou, China || Decision (Split) || 3 || 3:00
|-  style="background:#cfc;"
| 2020-01-11 || Win||align=left| Petchtanong Banchamek || Wu Lin Feng 2020: WLF World Cup 2019-2020 Final, Final|| Zhuhai, China ||Decision (Unanimous)  || 3 ||3:00
|-
! style=background:white colspan=9 |
|-  style="background:#cfc;"
| 2020-01-11 || Win||align=left| Tawanchai PK Saenchaimuaythaigym || Wu Lin Feng 2020: WLF World Cup 2019-2020 Final, Semi Final|| Zhuhai, China ||TKO (Punches)  || 2 || 0:50
|-  style="background:#CCFFCC;"
| 2019-10-26 || Win ||align=left| Wei Ninghui || Wu Lin Feng 2019: WLF -67kg World Cup 2019-2020 5th Group Stage || Zhengzhou, China || Decision (Unanimous) || 3 || 3:00
|-  bgcolor="#CCFFCC"
| 2019-08-31|| Win||align=left| Ilias Bulaid || Wu Lin Feng 2019: WLF -67kg World Cup 2019-2020 3rd Group Stage || Zhengzhou, China || Ext.R Decision (Unanimous) || 4 || 3:00
|-  bgcolor="#CCFFCC"
| 2019-06-29|| Win||align=left| Hamza Essalih || Wu Lin Feng 2019: WLF -67kg World Cup 2019-2020 1st Group Stage || Zhengzhou, China || TKO (Doctor Stoppage) || 2 || 0:17
|-  bgcolor="#CCFFCC"
| 2019-05-27|| Win||align=left| Jia Daobo || ONE Hero Series May || Beijing, China || KO (Body shots) || 2 || 1:49
|-  bgcolor="#CCFFCC"
| 2019-03-09|| Win||align=left| Pavel Grishanovich || All Star Fight || Bangkok, Thailand || KO || 2 || 1:49
|-  style="background:#FFBBBB;"
| 2018-12-15|| Loss ||align=left| Sergey Kulyaba || Kunlun Fight 79 – 66 kg Tournament, Quarter Finals || China || Decision (Unanimous) || 3 || 3:00
|-  style="background:#CCFFCC;"
| 2018-11-01|| Win ||align=left| Steven || Sanda Premier League || China || Decision (Unanimous) || 3 || 3:00
|-  style="background:#CCFFCC;"
| 2018-07-28|| Win ||align=left| Audi ||  || Rushan, Shandong, China || KO (Body Punches) || 1 || 1:40
|-  style="background:#CCFFCC;"
| 2018-07-07|| Win ||align=left| Meng Qinghao || Wu Lin Feng 2018: WLF -67kg World Cup 2018-2019 1st Round || Zhengzhou, China || Decision (Unanimous) || 3 || 3:00
|-  style="background:#CCFFCC;"
| 2018-06-20|| Win ||align=left| Zhao Yaguang ||  || China || Decision || 3 || 3:00
|-  style="background:#FFBBBB;"
| 2018-04-01|| Loss ||align=left| Zhang Chunyu || Kunlun Fight 71 || China || Extra Round Decision || 4 || 3:00
|-  style="background:#CCFFCC;"
| 2018|| Win ||align=left| David || Kung Fu Wang Zhongwang || China ||  Decision || 3 || 3:00
|-  style="background:#CCFFCC;"
| 2017|| Win ||align=left| Firat || Kung Fu Wang Zhongwang || China ||  Decision || 3 || 3:00
|-  style="background:#FFBBBB;"
| 2017-07-15|| Loss ||align=left| Kenta || Kunlun Fight 64 || China || KO (Right hook) || 2 || 1:45
|-  style="background:#FFBBBB;"
| 2017||Loss ||align=left| Li Yinggang ||  Kung Fu Wang Zhongwang  || China ||  TKO (Arm Injury) || 1||
|-  style="background:#FFBBBB;"
| 2016-12-23||Loss ||align=left| Aleksei Ulianov || Wu Fight || China ||  Decision || 3 || 3:00
|-  style="background:#cfc;"
| 2016-07-16||Win ||align=left| Liu Bing || Sanda Premier League || China || Decision  || 3 || 3:00
|-  style="background:#FFBBBB;"
| 2016|| Loss ||align=left| Meng Qinghao || Sanda Premier League || China || Decision (Unanimous) || 3 || 3:00
|- style="background:#CCFFCC;"
|  2016-01-16 || Win || align="left" | Saksurin Kitayonygut || Hero Legends || China || Decision  || 3||3:00
|- style="background:#CCFFCC;"
|  2015-10-31 || Win || align="left" | Vlad Tuinov || Kunlun Fight 33 || Changde, China || Decision (Split) || 3||3:00
|-
| colspan=9 | Legend:

See also
 List of male kickboxers

References 

Chinese male kickboxers
1992 births
Living people
Chinese sanshou practitioners
People from Zhoukou
Chinese wushu practitioners
Sportspeople from Henan
Featherweight kickboxers